Alvin Richard Mayer (August 28, 1924 – June 2, 1989) was an American professional golfer.

Mayer was born in Stamford, Connecticut. He apprenticed with renowned player and teacher Claude Harmon at the Winged Foot Golf Club in suburban New York City.

Mayer won seven times on the PGA Tour, between 1953 and 1965. Mayer almost won the 1954 U.S. Open, but a triple bogey on the final hole left him tied for third, two shots back, as Ed Furgol won.

Mayer's career year was 1957, when he finished the regulation 72 holes of the U.S. Open at Inverness Club tied with defending champion Cary Middlecoff. He won the 18-hole playoff 72 to 79, and his prize was $7,200. He later won $50,000 at the World Championship of Golf, topped the PGA Tour money list with winnings of $65,835, and won the PGA Player of the Year award. He also played on the 1957 Ryder Cup team.

Mayer battled alcoholism, which kept him from winning more often on the Tour. Mayer died at age 64 in Palm Springs, California.

Professional wins (7)

PGA Tour wins (7)

PGA Tour playoff record (3–1)

Major championships

Wins (1)

1 Defeated Middlecoff in an 18-hole playoff: Mayer 72 (+2), Middlecoff 79 (+9).

Results timeline

Note: Mayer never played in The Open Championship.

CUT = missed the half-way cut (3rd round cut in 1959 PGA Championship)
DQ = disqualified
R64, R32, R16, QF, SF = Round in which player lost in PGA Championship match play
"T" = tied

Summary

Most consecutive cuts made – 6 (twice)
Longest streak of top-10s – 2 (1957 U.S. Open – 1957 PGA)

U.S. national team appearances
Ryder Cup: 1957

References

External links

American male golfers
PGA Tour golfers
Ryder Cup competitors for the United States
Winners of men's major golf championships
Golfers from Connecticut
Sportspeople from Stamford, Connecticut
1924 births
1989 deaths